Armitage Saddle is the saddle at the head of Blue Glacier, overlooking the Howchin and Walcott Glaciers which drain toward Walcott Bay in the Koettlitz Glacier. The saddle is at the south end of the "Snow Valley" (the upper part of Blue Glacier) that was mapped by Armitage in 1902, and subsequently wrongly omitted from maps of the British Antarctic Expedition, 1910–13. The New Zealand Blue Glacier Party of the Commonwealth Trans-Antarctic Expedition, 1956–58, established a survey station on the saddle in September 1957. They named it for Lieutenant Albert Armitage, second-in-command of the British National Antarctic Expedition, 1901–04, in recognition of his exploration in this area.

References
 

Mountain passes of Victoria Land
Scott Coast